Lawson Welles (born May 6, 1975 in Lubbock, Texas) is the writer, director, producer and star of the motion picture, Cricket Snapper, released in 2005 by Phoenix Rising Band, Books and Films.

Cricket Snapper is based on the true story of Barbara Asher, who was charged but acquitted of the manslaughter and dismemberment of Michael Lord, a New Hampshire man who allegedly suffered a heart attack while chained in her dungeon. Rather than call the authorities, police said Asher confessed she and her boyfriend chopped up Lord's body in the bathtub and dumped it behind a Maine restaurant, but DNA testing of her bathtub revealed none of Lord’s DNA or any evidence of cleaning agents. According to the Quincy Patriot-Ledger story covering the film's Boston premiere on May 6, 2011, the dominatrix's boyfriend, Miguel Ferrer "was charged with being an accessory after the fact, has never been tried" and "fled after being indicted."

In Welles’ film, the dominatrix and her husband dump the body, but then are hunted down and murdered themselves out in the dark, snow-covered woods of Massachusetts by a vicious serial killer.

Lawson Welles has acted in Hollywood films such as Boston Girls (2008) starring Danny Trejo and Robert Miano. Stets also wrote and directed WHY WE FOUGHT, composed of interviews with World War II and Korean War veterans from the United States, Canada, Great Britain and Germany.

Cricket Snapper was released on October 10, 2005, the twentieth anniversary of the death of Lawson’s hero of the same surname, Orson Welles. Cricket Snapper cinematographer, Jerry Bagdasarian, was a veteran of the D-Day landings and worked on Rod Serling's Twilight Zone series before working on independent films. Lawson Welles was born on the 60th birthday of Orson Welles. Welles got the idea for the title after first meeting Bagdasarian to interview him over his experiences in World War II. Jerry showed Lawson a cricket snapper, a device paratroopers from the 82nd Airborne and 101st Airborne units used to communicate with one another. Cricket Snapper is not the first film to feature this device, as John Wayne explained its usage to his men in the World War II epic, The Longest Day. The soundtrack to Cricket Snapper includes tracks by Bill McElaney, Church of Satan High Priests, Anton LaVey and Peter H. Gilmore.

Filmography 
 Citizen Toxie: The Toxic Avenger IV (soundtrack music, 2000)
 Cricket Snapper - Episode One: Ball and Chain of Evidence (writer/director/producer/Alan McDermott, released on DVD by Film Baby Distributors, 2005)

External links 
 https://web.archive.org/web/20061219095831/http://www.oldnickmagazine.com/lawson_feature.php
 https://web.archive.org/web/20070930040739/http://www.zwire.com/site/news.cfm?newsid=13114749&BRD=1713&PAG=461&dept_id=24491&rfi=6
 http://pawtuckettimes.com/site/...?brd=1713&dept_id=24491&newsid=13114749
 https://web.archive.org/web/20061025164541/http://seacoastonline.com/news/hampton/01272006/news/84993.htm
 http://ledger.southofboston.com/articles/2006/01/12/news/news05.txt
 https://web.archive.org/web/20110930013141/http://www.heraldnews.com/news/local_news/x541362536/Why-they-fought
 http://www.wickedlocal.com/fall-river/news/x415850212/Why-they-fought

1975 births
Living people
American film directors